Khiloksky District is an administrative and municipal district (raion), one of the thirty-one in Zabaykalsky Krai, Russia. It is located in the southwest of the krai, and borders with Ulyotovsky District in the east, Krasnochikoysky District in the south, and with Petrovsk-Zabaykalsky District in the west. Its administrative center is the town of Khilok. Population:  33,434 (2002 Census);  The population of Khilok accounts for 36.3% of the district's total population.

History
The district was established on February 11, 1935.

Gallery 
Badinskaya steppe in Khiloksky district

See also
Gyrshelun

References

Notes

Sources

External links
Unofficial website of the town of Khilok. Information about Khiloksky District 

Districts of Zabaykalsky Krai
States and territories established in 1935

